Arthur Joseph Rooney II (born September 14, 1952) is the owner of the Pittsburgh Steelers of the National Football League (NFL).

Early life
Arthur Joseph Rooney II was born in Pittsburgh, Pennsylvania, the eldest of nine children of Patricia (Reagan) and longtime Steelers chairman Dan Rooney, and the grandson of Steelers founder “The Chief”, Art Rooney, Sr. He graduated from the University of Pittsburgh in 1978 with a B.A. in Political Science. He then attended Duquesne University’s School of Law, where he earned his J.D. degree in 1982.

Career
Rooney was named team president in May 2003. Prior to that, he served as vice president and general counsel of the Steelers, and has served on the board of directors of the Steelers since 1989. He currently serves as chairman of the NFL’s Stadium Committee, and serves on numerous NFL boards, including the Legislative Committee, the Management Council Executive Committee, the International Committee and the Digital Media Committee. Prior to his father's 2017 death, Rooney II held at least a 20% stake in the Steelers franchise, with a combination of him and his father owning at least 30% and was in line to inherit most of the share Dan Rooney held, which would make Rooney II the majority owner of the team. He is one of only two third-generation owners in the league, the other being John Mara, to whom he is related by marriage. (Mara's brother is married to Rooney's sister, and Rooney is the first cousin once removed of actresses Rooney Mara and Kate Mara.)

He currently holds an Of Counsel position with the law firm Buchanan Ingersoll & Rooney. He is active in the Pittsburgh community, devoting a substantial amount of his time to various organizations. He currently serves on the boards of the Pittsburgh Public Theater, Saint Vincent College, the Heinz History Center and the United Way of America.

Personal life
Rooney is married to Greta, and they have four children.

References

American lawyers
Sportspeople from Pittsburgh
Duquesne University alumni
University of Pittsburgh alumni
National Football League team presidents
Pittsburgh Steelers executives
1952 births
Living people
Rooney family
Pittsburgh Steelers owners